Selmania albertiana is a species of leaf beetle extant in the Democratic Republic of the Congo and Ivory Coast. It was first described by the Belgian entomologist  in 1941.

References 

Eumolpinae
Beetles of Africa
Beetles of the Democratic Republic of the Congo
Insects of West Africa
Beetles described in 1941